Seira dollfusi is a species of slender springtail in the family Entomobryidae.

References

Further reading

External links

 

Collembola
Animals described in 1899